Alfred Homer Patrick Scott (born 29 July 1934) is a former West Indian cricketer who played in one Test in 1953. 

Alfred Scott was a leg-break bowler and a lower-order batsman whose first-class cricket career was over before he was 20. In his third first-class match for Jamaica, against the Indian touring side in March 1953, at the age of 18, he took seven wickets with his leg-breaks and outperformed Alf Valentine, the established West Indies and Jamaica spinner. He was then selected alongside Valentine for the fifth and final Test match of the series, which took place at Kingston immediately after the Jamaica game. On a batsman's pitch, Scott achieved no success at all, his 44 overs costing 140 runs.

After this Test appearance, Scott played only one further first-class match: one of the two tour games for Jamaica against the MCC team in 1953-54, in which he took two wickets.

He moved to England to play league cricket, then later migrated to the United States.

References

External links
 Alfred Scott at CricketArchive
 

1934 births
Living people
West Indies Test cricketers
People from Saint Catherine Parish
Jamaican cricketers
Jamaica cricketers